Diadegma angitiaeforma is a wasp first described by Horstmann in 1969.  No subspecies are listed.

References

angitiaeforma
Insects described in 1969